The Unbroken Cycle (解连环) is a TV drama series produced by the former Television Corporation of Singapore (predecessor of MediaCorp, starring Singapore actors Fann Wong and Thomas Ong.  A television adaptation of a mystery novel by Singaporean novelist Wu Weicai about the fate of two star-crossed lovers over three lifetimes in pre-war (1920s), post-war (1950s) and modern Singapore, this 1996 drama serial won Fann Wong her first regional nomination as Best Actress at the Asian Television Awards.

Cast 
 Fann Wong - Ye Qin, Li Xiangmei, Zhu Zhiyue (Fourth Wife) aka Xibao
 Thomas Ong - Zhou Xinghuan, Zhang Hai
 Carole Lin
 Huang Peiru

External links 

Singapore Chinese dramas